Philip H. Towner (born 1953) is dean of the Nida Institute for Biblical Scholarship at the American Bible Society, New York City. He is also research professor of New Testament at Ewangelikalna Szkola Teologiczna in Wrocław, Poland. He has been a faculty member of Regent College (Vancouver, B.C.) and the University of Aberdeen. He is also a translation scholar with particular experience in SE Asia and the Americas.

Towner has served as Director of Translation Services for the United Bible Societies.



Selected works

Books

Articles & chapters

References

External links
NSTS profile for Towner

1953 births
Living people
Bible commentators

Academics of the University of Aberdeen